Toni Anastasovski (born 11 July 1969) is a retired Macedonian football midfielder.

Career
Born in Štip, SR Macedonia, he played in the Yugoslav First League with Macedonian side FK Vardar, between 1986 and 1989, and with Serbian side FK Rad in the 1989–90 season.

References

1969 births
Living people
Sportspeople from Štip
Macedonian footballers
Yugoslav footballers
Association football midfielders
FK Vardar players
FK Rad players
Yugoslav First League players